Ziskind is a surname meaning “sweet child.” Notable people with the surname include:

Tamar Ziskind (born 1985), Israeli beauty pageant contestant
Alexander Ziskind Maimon (1809–1887), Lithuanian rabbi
Haim Ziskind (born 1990), Israeli footballer

See also
Ziskin
Susskind